is a Japanese football player. He plays for Mito HollyHock.

Career
Yoshitake Suzuki joined FC Tokyo in 2016. On March 13, he debuted in J3 League (v SC Sagamihara).

Club statistics
Updated to 25 February 2019.

References

External links
Profile at FC Tokyo

1998 births
Living people
Association football people from Tokyo Metropolis
People from Kokubunji, Tokyo
Japanese footballers
J1 League players
J3 League players
FC Tokyo players
FC Tokyo U-23 players
Association football midfielders